Kevin Sirois (20 April 1949 – 14 May 1972) was a Canadian speed skater. He competed in three events at the 1972 Winter Olympics. He was killed in a cycling accident.

References

External links
 

1949 births
1972 deaths
Canadian male speed skaters
Olympic speed skaters of Canada
Speed skaters at the 1972 Winter Olympics
Speed skaters from Edmonton
Cycling road incident deaths
Road incident deaths in Canada
20th-century Canadian people